Year Hare Affair is a Chinese webcomic and media franchise by Lin Chao, initially under the pen name "" (Pinyin: ,  "flight against the light"). The comic uses anthropomorphic animals as an allegory for nations and sovereign states to represent 20th century political, military and diplomatic events.

An animated adaptation of the series started airing on the Internet in March 2015 and a free-to-play strategy video game based on it was released on iOS and Android in July 2015.

Characters

Factions and characters

Others

Included events
 Second Sino-Japanese War
 Chinese Communist Revolution
 Korean War
 Sino-Soviet Split
 United Nations General Assembly Resolution 2758
 Sino-Vietnamese War
 Scarborough Shoal standoff
 The Commission of Chinese aircraft carrier Liaoning
 U.S. bombing of the Chinese embassy in Belgrade
 Hainan Island incident
 Cold War
 Vietnam War
 Battle of the Paracel Islands
 Uganda–Tanzania War
 30 September Movement
 Sino-Soviet border conflict
 1972 Nixon visit to China
 Soviet–Afghan War
 Cultural Revolution
 Iran–Iraq War
 Dissolution of the Soviet Union
 Gulf War
 Chinese economic reform
 Third Taiwan Strait Crisis
 The Signing of Joint Communiqué of the Government of Japan and the Government of the People's Republic of China
 Yinhe incident
 Kosovo War
 September 11 attacks
 War in Afghanistan (2001–present)
 Chen Shui-bian corruption charges
 Senkaku Islands dispute
 Indo-Pakistani wars and conflicts
 Hundred Regiments Offensive

Video game

A free-to-play strategy role-playing video game based on the webcomic, was released on iOS and Android on 15 July 2015. The player controls one of three factions: Hare, Bald Eagle and Bear.

Reception

Critical response
The comic expresses the modern history of China and its international relations in a fun way. It has sparked patriotism in China's younger generations.

Hare is now used as Internet slang referring to China.

Criticisms 
The historical vision, provided in first two seasons of Year Hare Affair, came under heavy criticism in an overview on the Russian website South China Insight, especially Sino-Soviet relations. Though it is admitted that relations with Russia "occupy a leading place" in reflecting of Chinese history, but with a "complete disregard for historical facts", such as Soviet involvement in the Chinese Communist Party's foundation and the Red Army's liberation of Manchuria from Japanese forces. It was also noted that the Sino-Vietnamese War has been completely left behind.

Oiwan Lam of Global Voices Online finds racism in portraying the African as a hippopotamus, which she considers "a lazy and stupid animal". In that regard, "China's aid for Africa has also been simplified as a last resort because 'the first world refused to play with us'".

Ratings
The second and third season received 8.6 and 8.4 points out of 10 on Douban.

References

Further reading

External links
  Authors's Sina Weibo
  The original page where the author post the comic

Manhua titles
2011 comics debuts
2015 web series debuts
Animated web series
Chinese webcomics
Chinese web series
Comedy web series
Comics adapted into animated series
Comics adapted into video games
Comics about rabbits and hares
Fables
Mass media franchises
Works about China
Political webcomics